Grayson Jonathan McCouch (born October 29, 1968) is an American actor. He is  known for his roles as Morgan Winthrop on the daytime soap opera Another World and Dusty Donovan on the daytime soap opera As the World Turns. He also starred as Don Masters on the Nick at Nite family drama Hollywood Heights.

Early life and education
McCouch was born in New York City and raised in Chappaqua, New York, the son of Rina (Plotnik), a musician, and Donald Grayson McCouch, a banker. His mother is Israeli and served in the Israel Defense Forces.

McCouch graduated from Kent School in Kent, Connecticut, in 1987 and received his Bachelor of Arts degree in theater from Hamilton College. He later studied at the British American Drama Academy through a Yale University-sponsored study abroad program.

Career 
McCouch spent four seasons with the Williamstown Theater Festival where he performed in Arturo UI, The Visit, Threepenny Opera, A Midsummer Night's Dream, Inherit the Wind and The Moon Stone. While in London, he performed in Electra at the Almeida Theater and Women Beware Women at the Royal Court.

McCouch got his start on television as Dr. Morgan Winthrop on Another World in 1993. After moving to Los Angeles, the actor starred as Sean Logan on Legacy (1998–99). He played Dr. Mitchell Grace on All Souls (April 2001 – August 2001). Other appearances include Beverly Hills, 90210, The Cosby Mysteries, and The Agency. In 2003, McCouch landed the role as Dusty Donovan on As the World Turns, a role for which he earned a Daytime Emmy nomination for in 2006 for the Supporting Actor category.

His film credits includes the role of Gruber in Armageddon (1998), Airtight (1999), and Momentum (2003). In 2014, McCouch portrayed the doomed Thomas Wayne in the pilot episode of Gotham. He currently resides in New York City.

Filmography

References

External links

1968 births
Living people
American male film actors
American male stage actors
American male soap opera actors
American male television actors
American people of Israeli descent
Hamilton College (New York) alumni
Jewish American male actors
Kent School alumni
People from Chappaqua, New York
21st-century American Jews